The Queer Palm is an independently sponsored prize for selected LGBT-relevant films entered into the Cannes Film Festival. The award was founded in 2010 by journalist Franck Finance-Madureira. It is sponsored by Olivier Ducastel and Jacques Martineau, filmmakers of Jeanne and the Perfect Guy, The Adventures of Felix, Crustacés et Coquillages, and L'Arbre et la forêt.

The award recognizes a film for its treatment of LGBT themes and gleans from among those films nominated or entered under Official Selection, Un Certain Regard, International Critics' Week, Directors' Fortnight and the ACID section.

Along with Berlin's Teddy Award and Venice's Queer Lion, the Queer Palm is a major international film award dedicated specifically for LGBT cinema. However, the festival has faced some criticism for purportedly sidelining the award and not allowing it to become an official award of the festival organization.

Winners and selections

See also
Teddy Award
Queer Lion

References

External links
 Queer Palm

Cannes Film Festival

LGBT film awards
Awards established in 2010